James Logan Jones Sr. (June 26, 1912 – March 30, 1986) was an officer in the United States Marine Corps and is considered to be a "co-patron of amphibious reconnaissance" in the Fleet Marine Force.  He pioneered the United States' first 'amphib recon' units, the Observer Group and the FMF Amphib Recon companies during World War II.

He was the father of James L. Jones Jr., the 32nd Commandant of the Marine Corps, Supreme Allied Commander of Europe and U.S. National Security Advisor and the brother of William Kenefick Jones who rose to the rank of Lieutenant General in the USMC.

Early life and career
Jones was born in June 1912, and raised in Kansas City, Missouri, the son of Irene Catherine (née Kenefick) and Charles Vernon Jones. His grandfather founded The Jones Store. He had a brother, William Kenefick Jones (who became a Marine lieutenant general). James Jones graduated from Shattuck Military School, Faribault, Minnesota, in 1930, and various law schools. He joined the International Harvester Company working as a sales representative. By 1937, he was sent to Africa where he furnished various agencies and contractors with specifications and data on motor trucks and tractors. He traveled extensively in northern and western Africa, from Dakar in Senegal, to the Province of Southwest Africa, and later to Casablanca, Morocco, to cover the area from Gibraltar to the mouth of the Congo River. During this time, he learned to speak several languages.

Military service

Jones signed for commission in the United States Army Reserve, serving from September 13, 1933, to September 5, 1938. When World War II broke out, he departed Africa, due to the circumstances of military presence of Nazi Germany forces. While working in the Canal Zone, he applied for a commission in the United States Marine Corps upon the suggestion of his brother, William K. Jones. Although he was denied due to his age of 27, one of his references, the admiral in charge of the Caribbean area, persuaded General Holcomb, and Jones was subsequently approached by a colonel, a lieutenant colonel and a major asking him to resubmit his application. He did and transferred his army commission for a Marine commission in the Marine Forces Reserve on February 3, 1941, as a 2nd lieutenant.

Jones was assigned to the intelligence section on the Amphibious Corps staff of the Observer Group. He was fluent in several foreign languages and was extremely familiar with the target area of Africa; to include his experience in mechanical and mechanized vehicles and machinery; had experience in living in foreign lands; and had a military schooling and background. Because of these qualifications, he was assigned in February 1942 until September 1942, during which time he was promoted to captain. He became the commanding officer of the Amphibious Corps, Pacific Fleet's (ACPF) Amphib Recon Company on January 7, 1943.

Putting ashore from the submarine USS Nautilus, Jones and the V Amphibious Corps Reconnaissance Company attacked and took the Japanese-held atoll of Abemama during Operation Boxcloth, part of the larger U.S. effort to seize the Gilbert Islands in November 1943.

After spending 25 months of combat duty in the Pacific during World War II from 1943 to 1945, Major Jones was awarded several commendations.

References

1912 births
1986 deaths
Recipients of the Legion of Merit
Recipients of the Silver Star
United States Army officers
United States Marine Corps officers
United States Marine Corps personnel of World War II